Flax brevipennis is a moth of the family Erebidae first described by Michael Fibiger in 2011. It is found in Indonesia (western Sumatra).

The wingspan is 10–11 mm. The forewings have a costa which is shorter than the posterior margin. There are areas of more or less dark grey brown, including fringes. The base of the costa is black brown. There is a black-brown quadrangular patch in the upper medial area, with a black dot in the inner lower area. The crosslines are brown, outlined in beige, except for the terminal line, which is only indicated by black interveinal dots. The hindwings are grey. The underside of the forewings is unicolorous brown and the underside of the hindwings is grey with a discal spot.

References

Micronoctuini
Moths described in 2011
Taxa named by Michael Fibiger